Anthony Wilkinson (born 15 August 1981) is a New Zealand former cricketer. He played one first-class and one List A match for Otago.

See also
 List of Otago representative cricketers

References

External links
 

1981 births
Living people
New Zealand cricketers
Otago cricketers
Cricketers from Dunedin